Alfredo Maria Garsia (14 January 1928, Augusta, Sicily - 4 June 2004, Augusta, Sicily) was an Italian Roman Catholic priest and bishop.

Life
He was ordained priest on 1 July 1951. Pope Paul VI appointed him bishop of Caltanissetta on 21 December 1973 and he was consecrated on 2 February the following year by cardinal Salvatore Pappalardo. He remained bishop of the diocese until his retirement on 2 August 2003, guiding it through the enactment of the pronouncements of the Second Vatican Council and overseeing a visit by pope John Paul II and a diocesan synod. He was also president of the Fondazione Migrantes of the Italian Episcopal Conference. He died in 2004 and his funeral and burial were held by cardinal Salvatore De Giorgi and other bishops in Caltanissetta Cathedral.

References

1928 births
2004 deaths
People from Augusta, Sicily
Bishops of Caltanissetta
20th-century Italian Roman Catholic bishops